Santa Rosa North station (known as Santa Rosa–Guerneville Road during planning) is a Sonoma–Marin Area Rail Transit train station in Santa Rosa. It opened to preview service on July 1, 2017; full commuter service commenced on August 25, 2017.

The station closed October 28–31, 2019 due to the loss of power at crossings due to shutoffs.

References

External links

SMART - Stations

Transportation in Santa Rosa, California
Railway stations in the United States opened in 2017
2017 establishments in California
Sonoma-Marin Area Rail Transit stations in Sonoma County
Buildings and structures in Santa Rosa, California